Great Bazaar of Borujerd is located in the centre of the city and consists of many Rasteh Bazaars and Caravanserais. A Rasteh Bazaar is a lane with covered roof usually with shops and workshops of a particular profession. Some of the important Rasteh Bazaars of Borujerd are:

 Rassa or shoe makers and shoe shops bazaar which is the largest Rasteh
 Bazaare Mesgarha for coppersmiths
 Bazaare Chelengarha for blacksmiths
 Bazaare Ghofl Sazha for locksmiths 
 Bazaare Kaftar Forushha for birds and pigeons 
 Bazaare Yahoodiha or Jews Bazaar

Caravansaries have been used for trading as well as accommodation of  business people. Today, caravansaries of Borujerd are important centre of wholesale or regional, national or international trading of Persian rug and other handicrafts.

See also

Architecture in Iran
Borujerd
Buildings and structures in Lorestan Province
Bazaars in Iran
Tourist attractions in Lorestan Province